Brookula is a genus of minute sea snails or micromolluscs, marine gastropod molluscs unassigned in the superfamily Seguenzioidea.

Species
Species within the genus Brookula include:

 Brookula angeli (Tenison-Woods, 1876)
 Brookula annectens Powell, 1937
 Brookula argentina (Zelaya, Absalao & Pimenta, 2006)
 Brookula benthicola Dell, 1956
  † Brookula bifurcata Maxwell, 1992
 Brookula bohni Schwabe & Engl, 2008
 Brookula brevis (d'Orbigny, 1841)
 Brookula calypso (Melvill & Standen, 1912)
 Brookula charleenae Schwabe & Engl, 2008
 Brookula conica (Watson, 1886)
 Brookula contigua Powell, 1940
 Brookula coronis Barnard, 1963
 Brookula corula (Hutton, 1885)
 Brookula crebresculpta (Tate, 1899)
 Brookula decussata (Pelseneer, 1903)
 Brookula densilaminata (Verco, 1907)
 Brookula enderbyensis Powell, 1931
  † Brookula endodonta Finlay, 1924
 Brookula exquisita A. H. Clarke, 1961
 Brookula finesia Laseron, 1954
 Brookula finlayi Powell, 1933
 † Brookula fossilis Finlay, 1924
 † Brookula funiculata Finlay, 1924
 Brookula galapagana (Dall, 1913)
 Brookula gemmula (Turton, 1932)
 Brookula iki Kay, 1979
 † Brookula iredalei Finlay, 1924
 † Brookula kaawaensis Laws, 1940
 Brookula kerguelensis Thiele, 1925
 Brookula lamonti Clarke, 1961
 Brookula megaumbilicata Absalão & Pimenta, 2005
 Brookula nepeanensis (Gatliff, 1906)
 Brookula olearia Absalão & Pimenta, 2005
 Brookula paranaensis (Zelaya, Absalão & Pimenta, 2006)
 Brookula pfefferi Powell, 1951
 Brookula polypleura (Hedley, 1904)
 Brookula powelli Clarke, 1961
 Brookula prognata Finlay, 1927
 Brookula proseila Absalão & Pimenta, 2005
 † Brookula pukeuriensis Finlay, 1924
 Brookula spinulata Absalão, R.S., Miyaji & A.D. Pimenta, 2001 - Brazil
 Brookula stibarochila Iredale, 1912
 Brookula strebeli A. W. B. Powell, 1951
 Brookula tanseimaruae Tsuchida & Hori, 1996
 † Brookula tenuilirata Finlay, 1924

Species brought into synonymy
 Brookula (Aequispirella) Finlay, 1924: synonym of Aequispirella Finlay, 1924
 Brookula (Aequispirella) corula (Hutton, 1885): synonym of Brookula corula (Hutton, 1885)
 Brookula antarctica Dell, 1990: synonym of Brookula strebeli A. W. B. Powell, 1951
 Brookula augeria Laseron, 1954: synonym of Brookula angeli (Tenison-Woods, 1877)
 Brookula consobrina May, 1923: synonym of Brookula crebresculpta (Tate, 1899)
 Brookula corulum (Hutton, 1885): synonym of Brookula corula (Hutton, 1885)
 Brookula crassicostata (Strebel, 1908): synonym of Liotella crassicostata (Strebel, 1908)
 Brookula delli' Numanami, 1996: synonym of Brookula pfefferi Powell, 1951
 Brookula jacksonensis Laseron, 1954: synonym of Brookula nepeanensis (Gatliff, 1906)
 Brookula meridionale (Melvill & Standen, 1912): synonym of Munditia meridionalis (Melvill & Standen, 1912)
 Brookula obscura Laseron, 1954: synonym of Brookula angeli (Tenison-Woods, 1877)
 Brookula orospatia Laseron, 1954: synonym of Brookula angeli (Tenison-Woods, 1877)
 Brookula rossiana Dell, 1990: synonym of Brookula pfefferi Powell, 1951
 Brookula sinusbreidensis Numanami & Okutani, 1991: synonym of Brookula pfefferi Powell, 1951
 Brookula tumida Laseron, 1954: synonym of Brookula angeli (Tenison-Woods, 1877)
 Brookula turbinata Laseron, 1954: synonym of Brookula angeli (Tenison-Woods, 1877)

The following species are also mentioned in the book "New Zealand Mollusca" by A.W.B. Powell (1979) :
 Brookula aethiopica Brookula annulata Brookula anxia Brookula capensis Brookula coatsianum Brookula compacta Brookula denseplicata Brookula discoidea Brookula disjuncta Brookula gaudens Brookula johnstoni Brookula kilcundae Brookula petalifera Brookula pliculosa Brookula pulcherrima Brookula valdiviaeReferences

 Schwabe E. & Engl W. (2008). Description of two new deep-water species of the genus Brookula Iredale, 1912 (Mollusca, Gastropoda, Trochoidea), with a revision of the genus for the Subantarctic and Arctic Sector of the Atlantic Ocean. Zootaxa, 1866: 187-204

External links
 Spencer, H.; Marshall. B. (2009). All Mollusca except Opisthobranchia. In: Gordon, D. (Ed.) (2009). New Zealand Inventory of Biodiversity. Volume One: Kingdom Animalia. 584 pp
 Powell A. W. B., New Zealand Mollusca'', William Collins Publishers Ltd, Auckland, New Zealand 1979 
 
 ZipCodeZoo

 
Gastropod genera